Richard Brightfield (born 1927) is an American writer of children's gamebooks.

He wrote a number of Choose Your Own Adventure books, and was the first author to establish himself within that series after its founders Edward Packard and R.A. Montgomery. Although he is probably best known among collectors of that series for his books on martial arts, his earliest works for that series had quite different subject matter, being focused on various scientific topics or fantasy.

Brightfield resides in Palm Beach County, Florida.

Choose Your Own Adventure
19. Secret of the Pyramids
26. The Phantom Submarine
30. The Curse of Batterslea Hall
33. The Dragons' Den
36. The Secret Treasure of Tibet
46. The Deadly Shadow
70. Invaders of the Planet Earth
75. Planet of the Dragons
82. Hurricane!
88. Master of Kung Fu
102. Master of Tae Kwon Do
106. Hijacked!
108. Master of Karate
126. Master of Martial Arts
148. Master of Judo
166. Master of Aikido
176. Master of Kendo

Choose Your Own Adventure - Young Indiana Jones Chronicles
1. The Valley of the Kings
2. South of the Border
3. Revolution in Russia
4. Masters of the Louvre
5. African Safari
6. Behind the Great Wall
7. The Roaring Twenties
8. The Irish Rebellion

Choose Your Own Nightmare
3. Island of Doom
12. Something's in the Woods
15. How I Became a Freak

Earth Inspectors
7. China: Why Was an Army Made of Clay?
8. U.S.A.: What is the Great American Invention?

Escape from Tenopia
2. Trapped in the Sea Kingdom
3. Terror on Kabran
4. Star System Tenopia

Escape from the Kingdom of Frome
2. The Forest of the King
3. The Caverns of Mornas
4. The Battle of Astar

Mystic Knights of Tir na Nog
3. Water Around, Earth Below!

Your AMAZING Adventures
1. The Castle of Doom
2. Island of Fear
3. Terror Under the Earth
4. The Dragonmaster
5. Revenge of the Dragonmaster
6. The Battle of the Dragons

See also
 List of Choose Your Own Adventure books
 List of gamebooks

References 

1927 births
Living people
Choose Your Own Adventure writers

American children's writers